Talman Gardner (born March 10, 1980) is a former American football wide receiver. He was drafted by the New Orleans Saints out of Florida State in the seventh round of the 2003 NFL draft. He played two years for the Saints and started one game. In his career, he had a total of 4 regular season catches.

References

External links 
 Just Sports Stats
 Florida State Seminoles bio

1980 births
American football wide receivers
Florida State Seminoles football players
Living people
New Orleans Saints players